Luisa Maffi Ph.D. is co-founder and Director of Terralingua, an international NGO devoted to sustaining the biocultural diversity   of life - the world’s biological, cultural, and linguistic diversity - through research, education, policy-relevant work, and on-the-ground action. She is a pioneer and leading thinker in the field of biocultural diversity.

Career
With a background in linguistics, anthropology, and ethnobiology, she has conducted fieldwork in Somalia, Mexico, China and Japan. Her research has been supported by grants and fellowships from NATO, the US National Science Foundation, and the Wenner-Gren Foundation, among others. In 1998-2003 she was a Research Associate in the Anthropology Department at the Field Museum of Natural History in Chicago, Illinois, and in 1999-2004 a Research Associate in the Anthropology Department at the Smithsonian Institution’s National Museum of Natural History in Washington, D.C. In 1997-2000 she held a National Research Service Award fellowship from the US National Institutes of Health. She was a Fellow of the Society for Applied Anthropology (2003–2008) and in 2010 was appointed as an International Fellow of the Explorers Club. Her most recent book, co-authored with Ellen Woodley, is Biocultural Diversity Conservation: A Global Sourcebook (Earthscan, 2010).

References

External links
Seed Magazine
Wired Magazine
New York Times Magazine
Nat Geo Blog
Wiser Earth Blog
Huffington Post
Nat Geo Blog
Resurgence
CBC interview
Terralingua
Terralingua Biocultural Diversity portal
Activities and Accomplishments (1996-2008)

American anthropologists
Living people
Year of birth missing (living people)